Phoebe Hearst Elementary School is a public elementary school in the Del Cerro area of San Diego, California, under the San Diego Unified School District. It enrolls around 520 students in grades K-5.

History
The school was named after Phoebe Apperson Hearst, one of the founders of the modern Parent-Teacher Association. The school's PTA branch grew out of the Allied Gardens branch of the PTA.

The first students were admitted in February, 1958 and the school was officially dedicated in January, 1959. The 50th anniversary of the school was marked with a celebration on May 22, 2009.

Academic standards and discipline
Hearst Elementary was one of 11 San Diego Unified School District campuses honored for academic excellence by California Business for Academic Excellence, a group representing member businesses in the state. However, despite their relatively high score of 902 on California's Academic Performance Index, which assigns schools a score between 200 and 1,000 points, they scored only 2 out of 10 on the "similar-schools ranking" measure, which compares institutions with similar ethnic compositions; their scores fell after the similar-schools ranking was adjusted to account for the number of students whose ethnicity was unspecified.

The school has been affected by state budget cuts, leading to shortages in basic supplies; in 2004, a local real estate company held a community fundraiser to purchase pens, pencils, markers, erasers, and scissors for the school.

In 2003, a district school board trustee criticized the school's implementation of the district zero-tolerance disciplinary policy when her nine-year-old son was suspended for one day for bringing a butter knife to school for a science experiment. A teacher reported the boy to the principal after having seen the boy showing the knife to a friend.

Environment
Traffic remains a concern in the area around the school. Various measures to ameliorate the problem have been proposed, including a student valet program, which was successfully implemented at another district school; however, the principal at Hearst declined to initiate such a program out of concerns for student safety and the desire to protect students from rude parents. The school's newspaper publishes the license plate numbers of motorists who violate double-parking laws or cause other traffic issues. Parents and administrators at the school came into conflict with San Diego State University in 2005 over the university's plans to build faculty and student housing in the area; parents claimed that the planned 540-unit development would increase the number of cars passing through the street in front of the school to an unhandleable level.

Extracurricular activities
The school's Inventor's Showcase is held annually; some inventions submitted in 2006 include a more humane mousetrap, a house key hiding place disguised as a bird-feeder, and a solar-powered dog door.

Two of their students also write movie reviews for The San Diego Union-Tribune. Other events supported by the school's PTA include a book fair and the Fall Fiesta, an annual carnival.

References

External links
Official site

Schools in San Diego
Public elementary schools in California
Educational institutions established in 1958
1958 establishments in California